C66 or C-66 may refer to:
 C-66 (Michigan county highway)
 Berlin Defence (chess), a chess opening
 Caldwell 66, a globular cluster
 Caudron C.66, a French biplane
 , later renamed HMCS Quebec, a Fiji-class cruiser of the Royal Canadian Navy
 Lockheed C-66 Lodestar, an American transport aircraft
 Migration for Employment Convention, 1939 of the International Labour Organization
 Siemens C66, a mobile phone